Super Rabbit may refer to:

Super-Rabbit, a 1943 Warner Bros. cartoon starring Bugs Bunny, parodying the popular comic book character Superman
Super Rabbit, a cartoon animal superhero from Marvel Comics predecessor Timely Comics